Juan Branco is a French political activist, writer and lawyer.

He gained notoriety in 2019 with his book Crépuscule, critical of French President Emmanuel Macron, and in early 2020, with his involvement in the Griveaux affair. He has been a supporter of the Yellow vests movement.

Early life and education 
Branco was born in 1989 in Estepona, near Málaga. He is the son of film producer Paulo Branco.

He went to the École alsacienne, a private high school in Paris. He is said to have had a "golden childhood" in the Saint-Germain-des-Prés neighborhood of Paris, being acquainted to stars like Catherine Deneuve.

He studied as an undergraduate at Sciences Po and as a graduate and PhD student at the École normale supérieure, where he was "auditeur libre" (audit student).

He wrote his thesis at the École normale supérieure in 8 months, and this let him become a lawyer without having to pass the selective exam to enter in the school for lawyers.

Political activity 
As a student, Branco actively supported former right-wing Prime Minister Dominique de Villepin, a friend of his mother's.

Afterwards he supported The Greens (France) and then went on to participate in the campaign of future President François Hollande (Socialist Party). He worked several months during the campaign for future French Minister of Culture and Communications Aurélie Filippetti, who refused him a position of chief of staff after the election.

Branco then joined the left-wing populist party La France Insoumise. He stood in the 2017 French legislative election for Seine-Saint-Denis's 12th constituency where he placed fourth. His former running-mate stated that Branco "wanted to win a parliamentary seat and abandoned the party after the loss". After he was refused a sufficiently high spot on the electoral list of La France Insoumise in the 2019 European Parliament election in France his support for the party ended and he called for an abstention in the election.

He became a vocal supporter of the Yellow vests movement, some of whose members he also represented in court, including Maxime Nicolle, and a critic of President of France Emmanuel Macron thereafter.

In 2018 he outed the homosexuality of his former class-mate and government spokesman Gabriel Attal on Twitter.

Crépuscule 
Branco's book Crépuscule, in which he criticized the French president Emmanuel Macron, was published in 2019. It was commercially successful but received mostly negative reviews in the French press.

Legal advice and representations 
In 2015, Branco was the legal advisor to WikiLeaks and met with Julian Assange, trying to help obtain asylum for Assange in France.

Branco passed the bar in 2017 and had three clients in the next two years, including his father, and was receiving welfare assistance (Revenu de solidarité active) during that time.

He represented his father Paulo Branco and prevailed against Terry Gilliam in The Man Who Killed Don Quixote case.

In 2021, he represented one of the defendants in the Mila affair cyberbullying case.

Griveaux affair 
In February 2020 it was reported that he was representing the Russian activist Petr Pavlensky both before and after the latter leaked sexually explicit videos depicting Benjamin Griveaux, then candidate in the mayoral elections for Paris. Multiple sources claim that Branco was involved in the leak, a criminal offense under French law. This was denied by Branco.

Pavlensky was arrested on 14 February 2020 for stabbing two people during a New Year's Eve party organized by Branco and his girlfriend in a Paris flat owned by the latters' parents.

After Branco was hired by Pavlensky as his defense attorney, the chairman of the French bar association opened an inquiry into the appropriateness of the defense in light of Branco's involvement in the affair. No conflict of interest was found, but Branco was advised to step down as Pavlensky's defense attorney nonetheless due to a "lack of distance". Branco originally followed the advice but later reverted his decision and joined the defense of Pavlensky once more. Branco went on to request a psychological evaluation of Griveaux, the victim of the alleged crime, whose defense called the request "grotesque and hateful". The request was denied by the examining magistrate as it was deemed "not useful for the establishment of the truth".

In October 2020, it was reported that disciplinary proceedings were being pursued against Branco by the Paris Bar Association following his involvement in the affair.

Controversial claims 

Branco claimed to have been chief of staff of the French Minister of Culture and Communications Aurélie Filippetti, but Filippetti denied it. She later stated that he "demanded to be hired as her chief of staff at age 22", that he "completely lost it when he was refused the position" and told her that he recorded their conversations. She described him as "dangerous, intelligent and skillful" and as "megalomaniacal, a compulsive liar and very, very manipulative".

In 2016 he solicited Salah Abdeslam, the only surviving member of the group directly involved in the attacks in Paris on 13 November 2015 (in which 130 people were killed and 683 others were injured), proposing in a letter to help in his legal defense and claiming to be representing Julian Assange. As he was not admitted to the bar and therefore not legally permitted to practice law at the time, one of the French lawyers representing Abdeslam characterized Brancos actions as attempted fraud.

In 2018, L'Express stated that Branco was making false statements on his CV and elsewhere. After Branco defended himself from this accusation, L'Express provided additional information to prove their claims. Branco claimed to have been a lecturer at the École normale supérieure, but the school told L'Express that it refers to an exercise for students that every student of the school had to do. He also claimed "never having created a Skyblog", but L'Express provided captures of the blog he co-administered during his high-school years. The blog invited the pupils to rate the girls in the school according to their physique and use the word "blondasse" ("blondie").

Branco has previously claimed that he worked as a "special assistant" to the Prosecutor of the International Criminal Court. Asked for a clarification by the French journal GQ France, the Court responded that Branco ""claims to have been the assistant of the Prosecutor (..) while in reality he was an intern (...) and then worked at the OTP Public Information Unit".

In 2018, he accused peacekeeping forces of the United Nations Multidimensional Integrated Stabilization Mission in the Central African Republic (MINUSCA) of having been involved in a massacre in the city of Bangui - an accusation denied by MINUSCA - he was expelled from the country. He had been tasked as an independent expert for the United Nations with developing a strategy for investigations conducted by the Special Criminal Court in the Central African Republic. He was fired by the UN less than a week after his mission started.

Ongoing justice investigation for rape 

In April 2021, a 20-year-old woman accused Branco of abusing her. She told the police she had felt threatened and coerced by Branco into a sexual relationship while she was under the influence of a drug they had taken together.

Branco claimed the relation was consensual.
 
He has been put under official criminal investigation on the count of rape in November 2021.

Self-promotion on Wikipedia 
Branco has been editing his own Wikipedia pages for many years, attempting to embellish his biography. He makes his edits under multiple identities, using what are known as sockpuppets. He has also edited articles of others to "settle accounts" by portraying them in a negative light.

He once wrote a threatening letter to the employer of another Wikipedia editor, pretending to be a "Wikipedia administrator" named "Addas Karadas" and threatening legal action.

Bibliography 
 Réponses à Hadopi (Paris, Capricci, 2011)
 De l'affaire Katanga au contrat social global: Un regard sur la Cour pénale internationale (Paris, 2015, LGDJ-IUV, 2015)
 L'ordre et le monde (Paris, Fayard, 2016), edited by Alain Badiou and Barbara Cassin
 D'après une image de Daesh (Paris, Lignes, 2017)
Contre Macron (Edition Divergence, 2019)
 Crépuscule (Paris, Au Diable Vauvert, 2019) 
 Assange, l'antisouverain (Paris, Éditions du Cerf, 2020)

References 

Living people
French people of Spanish descent
21st-century French lawyers
1989 births
École Normale Supérieure alumni